Genipabu (or Jenipabu) is a beach with a complex of dunes, a lagoon and an environmental protection area (APA) located close to Natal, one of the most famous post-cards of the Rio Grande do Norte Brazilian state.

Genipabu is used for "buggie" and formerly dromedary rides. Camel rides on the dunes were popular for many years, but as of 2020 they are no longer available. A sport that is played in the dunes around the lake is the "esquibunda", in which a person slides the dunes with a wooden board.

"Buggie" rides are offered locally in two styles, com emoção (lit:'with emotion': a riskier ride) or sem emoção (lit:'without emotion': a safer one). One should be aware, however, that only authorized professionals responsible for security of both tourists and environment should be hired.

The dunes of Genipabu are movable, because the hard winds in the Rio Grande do Norte coastline moves the sand from one point to another, shaping the landscape.

References

External links

Beaches of Brazil
Environment of Rio Grande do Norte
Landforms of Rio Grande do Norte